Knut Solem (born 30 July 1946) is a Norwegian diplomat.

He took the cand.mag. degree and started working for the Norwegian Ministry of Foreign Affairs in 1976. He served as Norway's consul-general in Rio de Janeiro from 1989 to 1994, Norway's ambassador to the United Arab Emirates from 1994 to 1996, to Singapore from 1996 to 1999. After stints as a special adviser in the Ministry of Foreign Affairs from 1999 and head of department from 2004, he again served as ambassador to Mexico from 2005 to 2009 and the Philippines from 2009 to 2014.

References

1946 births
Living people
Norwegian civil servants
Norwegian expatriates in Brazil
Ambassadors of Norway to the United Arab Emirates
Ambassadors of Norway to Singapore
Ambassadors of Norway to Mexico
Ambassadors of Norway to the Philippines